The Nourse-Farwell House is located in the Harvard Center Historic District, a U.S. Historic District in the center of Harvard, Massachusetts.

The house is believed to have been built in c. 1800 by Harvard resident Benjamin Nourse. The house was sold in 1833 to John Farwell who served as a Harvard town selectman in 1854 and assessor from 1860 to 1863.

The house still stands today located on Elm Street located off of the Harvard Town Common.

References

Federal architecture in Massachusetts
Buildings and structures in Harvard, Massachusetts
Houses completed in 1800
Houses in Worcester County, Massachusetts